is a shooting video game. The game was released in Japan on 12 January 2017  It has been described as a "Zombie Panic shooting Action" ("ゾンビパニック・シューティングアクション") title and it is considered to be within the Onechanbara videogames series: the setting is, in fact, the same universe. However, unlike the Onechanbara's games, the game is set in a private institute attacked by zombies while five young girl students have to fight for their survival.

Introduction 

Set in the "Kirisaku" Japanese private institute ("私立霧索高等学校", "Shiritsu Kirisaku Kotogakko"), the game involves a sudden massive zombie invasion of the school. Just five young girls managed to survive but they have to fight against hordes of horrific zombies with a large amount of weapons from common Baseball bats to powerful machine guns, sniper rifles or rocket launchers. Each character has her own skills like special martial arts. When the girls are in serious danger they can throw their costumes to zombies to diverte zombie's attention. The game has been rated as 17+ in Japan for violence and sexual content. In multiplayer mode, 5 players can play together.

Playable characters 

 
 She is a 17 year old girl who loves robot anime cartoons: she is also one of five main protagonists. Akiba is very skilled with a handgun, and is also a Kendo student.

 
 She lost both her parents when she was very young so she grew up in Akiba's family. She is 17. Risa is very skilled with assault rifles and she is able to use Naginata.

 
 She is a close friend of Enami and her habit is to hide her true emotions. She is 16, the youngest of the group. Mayaya is very skilled with sub-machine guns and she used to be in the softball team.

 
 She is a very good student with perfect scores. She is 18, the eldest of the group. Enami is skilled with sniper rifles and she used to be part of the soccer team.

 
 She used to be an idol when she was younger. She is 17. Rei is very skilled with shotguns and she is also able at Karate martial art.

Other characters 

 
 Coming from the Onechanbara series, Anna is a special forces member focused on zombies. She joins the rescue force.

 
 A main antagonist of this game. He is a mysterious unidentified sentient zombie who could be the cause behind the zombies' invasion of the school. Nobody knows his true intentions and he is hidden inside the institute.

Reception

References

External links 

2017 video games
D3 Publisher games
High school-themed video games
PlayStation 4 games
Third-person shooters
Unreal Engine games
Video games about zombies
Video games developed in Japan
Video games featuring female protagonists
Windows games